The Oregon Food Bank is a hunger relief organization based in the U.S. state of Oregon.

History

The Oregon Food Bank began as Oregon Food Share (OFS) which was founded in 1982. OFS created the first statewide foodbank network in the United States in the early 1980s. Around the same time period, the US government established programs to distribute food and other commodities in order to deplete federal stockpiles and assist low-income Americans. Oregon Food Share was contracted by the state of Oregon to handle the state's share of the aid. 

In 1988, OFS merged with Interagency Food Bank to become Oregon Food Bank.

In 1988 Oregon Food Share started the Waterfront Blues Festival, an annual music festival that takes place over 4th of July weekend in Tom McCall Waterfront Park in downtown Portland. The festival was subsequently organized by the Oregon Food Bank after the merger and name change; it helped support OFB through fundraising and food donations. In 2018, the food bank stepped away from organizing the Blues Festival after 30 years but remained a beneficiary.

Mission and Services

OFB's core mission is to eliminate hunger and its root causes in Oregon and Southwest Washington. They strive to do this through providing food and food subsidies, establishing community programs that address food insecurity, and supporting other organizations throughout Oregon with their network of services.

See also

 List of food banks

References

External links
 

Food banks in Oregon
Non-profit organizations based in Oregon
501(c)(3) organizations